Casque and Gauntlet (also known as C&G) is the second-oldest of the twelve senior societies at Dartmouth College.  C&G was founded in 1886, just after the Sphinx, and moved to its current location at 1 South Main Street in  1893.  The house was built in 1823 by Samuel Alden, and in 1915 the society installed a rear addition designed by Paterson, New Jersey architect Fred Wesley Wentworth, a founding member.  The house is the oldest and longest-occupied building of any society at Dartmouth.

C&G membership is co-ed and anonymous.  Members of C&G nominate and select tappees as a group.  Tapping takes place at a time the College coordinates with the other senior societies, usually around Winter Carnival.  Following coeducation at Dartmouth in 1972, the class of 1979 delegation voted unanimously to nominate women for membership.  The first six women members of C&G joined the class of 1980 delegation.

While C&G's membership is not secret, some elements of the society are kept secret, as one might expect from a sorority or fraternity.  Society meetings, held — like all Dartmouth senior societies — on Monday nights, are closed; the initiation ceremony and other details are also kept secret.

Notable members of past delegations include Theodor Seuss Geisel (Dr. Seuss), Nelson Rockefeller, David T. McLaughlin, James Nachtwey, Robert Reich, Rukmini Callimachi, and Mindy Kaling.

See also
 Dartmouth College student groups
Collegiate secret societies in North America

References

External links
Official site

Dartmouth College undergraduate societies
Student societies in the United States
Fred Wesley Wentworth buildings